Actinotocarcinus is an extinct genus of Miocene crab, and is the only genus in the subfamily Actinotocarcininae of the family Epialtidae, though was originally classified in the family Majidae.  Actinotocarcinus comprises two species, A. chidgeyi, and A. maclauchlani, both from Miocene-aged marine strata of New Zealand.

References

Majoidea
Decapod genera
Prehistoric crustacean genera
Miocene crustaceans
Prehistoric arthropods of Oceania